Saspol Caves ( Gon-Nila-Phuk Cave Temples) are situated in the hills behind Saspol, Ladakh, India, which is about 76 km from the city centre of Leh. Paintings exist in five caves, two of them extensively damaged. One of the painted caves, that have been given a coat of lime wash and red paint in the exterior is the most visited and is considered as the main cave. The paintings of Anuttarayoga Tantra (also known as Yoganiruttaratantra) in the main cave are very rare for the period of execution. These caves are under the administration of Likir Monastery.

Dating the era

Very few early painted cave temples exist in Ladakh and these paintings date to the late 14th/15th century CE.

Preservation status

The caves, also known as Gon-Nila-Phuk Cave temples, are in danger of total collapse and were therefore listed in 2016 World Monuments Watch. Rammed earth fortifications can be seen on top of the hill near the caves.

Conservation 

Art and architectural conservation projects were carried out by the INTACH Ladakh Chapter in 2015 and 2016 in collaboration with M/s Art Conservation Solutions. The project was funded in 2015 by the Prince Claus Fund and in 2016 and 2018 by the World Monuments Fund.

Gallery

See also

 Tourism infrastructure
 Tourism in Ladakh
 Geography of Ladakh
 India-China Border Roads
 List of districts of Ladakh
 Siachen Base Camp (India) 

 Borders
 Actual Ground Position Line (AGPL), India-Pakistan border across Siachen region
 Line of Actual Control (LAC), India-China border across Ladakh
 Line of Control (LoC), India-Pakistan border across Ladakh and Jammu and Kashmir

 Conflicts
 Sino-Indian War
 Indo-Pakistani wars and conflicts
 Siachen conflict
 Siachen Glacier

References

External links
 The Painted Caves of Saspol February 7, 2017, World Monuments Fund
 Saspol Caves C.P.R. Environmental Education Centre, Chennai, Ministry of Environment and Forests& Climate Change, Govt of India

Ladakh
Caves of Ladakh